Meteor Man may refer to:

 The Meteor Man (film), a 1993 film about a superhero, starring Robert Townsend
 Meteor Man (comic), a 1993 Marvel Comics limited series based on the film
 Looter (comics), a Marvel Comics supervillain also known as Meteor Man
 Meteor Man, a character in the animated series Birdman and the Galaxy Trio
"Meteor Man", a song by Dee D. Jackson